B.G Sports Club (commonly known as B.G Sports, or simply as B.G) is a Maldivian multi-sports club based in Male, that competes in Maldivian Second Division Football Tournament.

History
The club was founded in 1996, by a group of neighbors only with the interest in participating in the popular traditional game Baibalaa. Later on the same year the club decided to represent its name in different sports and started participating in different domestic competition and tournaments. The club competed in Baibalaa, Football, Basketball, Athletics, swimming, netball, cricket etc.

B.G Sports Club is widely popular in the traditional game Baibalaa. Baibalaa tournament was introduced in 1996 and 21 tournament were held from 1996 to 2015. The club advanced to 15 final matches and won a record 11 titles. More over the club helped its junior team (B.G New Generation) to reach final match along with its senior team in 2006. This was the only final match in which both the finalist were related to the same club. At that time the junior team's average age was under 16. In 2015, government of Maldives in association with Baibalaa Association of Maldives held a special edition of Baibalaa tournament to celebrate the independence day of Maldives and once again the club proudly won the title beating all opponents easily.

B.G Sports Club is also having its name on domestic football . The club has been competing in different divisions since its creation and were Runners-up in Third Division Football Tournament. B.G Sports won the title in 2012 Second Division Football Tournament advancing the club to the top league which was known as Dhivehi League (currently known as Dhivehi Premier League).

The club finished on 3rd at the end of Dhivehi league 2013 having a strong team which included some key players of Maldives National Football Team. In 2014 B.G Sports finished at the bottom of the table and escaped without been relegated to second division by winning the relegation matches. In 2015 Dhivehi Premier League the club won only 3 matches out of 14. There were 4 draws and 7 losses which made the club to sit on 7th position at the end of the season.

Apart from sports activities the club and its member are widely active in volunteer services.

Players

Left Midfielder/Forward: David Carmona
Centre Forward: Abdulla Muaz

Honours

Domestic Football competitions
Second Division Football Tournament
Winners (1) 2012
Third Division Football Tournament
Runners-up (1) 2011

Baibalaa Championship
Winners (11) – Record
**(Hijri year in bracket)
1996 (1416), 1997 (1417), 1998 (1418), 1999 (1419), 2000 (1420), 2005 (1426), 2006 (1427), 2008 (1429), 2010 (1431), 2012 (1433), 2014 (1435)
Runners-up
**(Hijri year in bracket)
2000 (1421), 2001 (1422), 2004 (1425), 2007 (1428)

Minivan 50 Baibalaa Championship 2015
Winners (1) – Record
**This was a special edition of Baibalaa tournament held to celebrate the 50th Independence day of Maldives.

References

External links

Football clubs in the Maldives
Dhivehi Premier League clubs